Standiford is a defunct neighborhood in Louisville, Kentucky, United States.  Its boundaries are Interstate 65 to the east and the Louisville International Airport to the north, west and south.  The neighborhood was displaced for expansion of the airport, and is currently the site for Louisville Air National Guard Base, which was relocated to make room for an expansion of the UPS WorldPort.

References

External links
Street map of Standiford

Neighborhoods in Louisville, Kentucky
Former populated places in Kentucky